Bernard Tiphaine (29 July 1938 in Paris – 19 October 2021) was a French actor and artistic director, born on July 29, 19381 in Paris 15th and died on October 19, 2021 in Châteauneuf-de-Gadagne.

He is well-known for his role in The Fire Within with Maurice Ronet and in La Difficulté d'être infidèle.

He is also known for his work in dubbing.

Personal life 
His wife Claudie was born in 1930 and died in 1995. 

He had 2 children : a daughter, Marion born in 1965 and a son, Gilles born in 1966, deceased in 2005. 

He retired during 2018 after being diagnosed with Alzheimer's disease. His daughter Marion announced his death on October 19, 2021, as a result of the disease.

Dubbing 
Very active in dubbing, he was notably the French voice of Christopher Walken, Chuck Norris, Donald Sutherland, Barry Bostwick and James Caan, as well as a recurring voice of Jeremy Irons and Harvey Keitel.

In animation, he was the French voice of Bender in Futurama (season 1 to 3), of Dr. Finkelstein in The Nightmare before Christmas, of Anton Ego in Ratatouille and of Jean-Roger Cornichon in the works The Razmoket. In video games, he is also the French voice of President John Henry Eden in Fallout 3 and Riordan in Dragon Age: Origins.

In 2017 he participated, alongside 15 other great French dubbing voices, in the short film On s'est fait doubler !.

Filmography

Films 
 Le Feu follet (1963): Milou
 La Difficulté d'être infidèle (1964): Olivier
 Le Coup de grâce (1965): Mario
 La Dame de pique (1965): Tomsky
 La Seconde Vérité (1966): Vaden
 Deux billets pour Mexico (1967): Julien
 La Maison de campagne (1969): Louis-Philippe de Moncontour
 Céleste (1970): un barbouze
 Un officier de police sans importance (1973): un policier
 La situation est grave... mais pas désespérée (1976)
 Je te tiens, tu me tiens par la barbichette (1979)
 Madame Claude 2 (1981): Robert

Television 

 1961 : Le Rouge et le Noir de Pierre Cardinal : Norbert de La Mole
 1965 : En votre âme et conscience, épisode La canne à épée : Mr Steiner
 1966 : Les Compagnons de Jéhu de Michel Drach
 1966 : La 99ème minute de François Gir
 1967 : Salle no 8 de Jean Dewever et Robert Guez
 1968 : Les Cinq Dernières Minutes, épisode Les Enfants du faubourg de Claude Loursais
 1970 : Au théâtre ce soir : Dix Petits Nègres d'Agatha Christie, mise en scène Raymond Gérôme, réalisation Pierre Sabbagh, théâtre Marigny
 1972 : Au théâtre ce soir : Folie douce de Jean-Jacques Bricaire et Maurice Lasaygues, mise en scène Michel Roux, réalisation Pierre Sabbagh, Théâtre Marigny
 1973 : Les Cinq Dernières Minutes : Meurtre par intérim de Claude Loursais
 1973 : Les deux maîtresses d'après Alfred de Musset : Valentin Moreuil
 1974 : Au théâtre ce soir : Le Sexe faible d'Édouard Bourdet, mise en scène Jacques Charon, réalisation Georges Folgoas, Théâtre Marigny
 1974 : Entre toutes les femmes de Maurice Cazeneuve
 1974 : Le deuil sied à Électre d'Eugene O'Neill, réalisation de Maurice Cazeneuve : Adam Brant
 1976 : Les Douze Légionnaires de Bernard Borderie
 1977 : Au théâtre ce soir : Les Choutes de Pierre Barillet et Jean-Pierre Grédy, mise en scène Michel Roux, réalisation Pierre Sabbagh, théâtre Marigny
 1977 : Au théâtre ce soir : L'École des cocottes de Paul Armont et Marcel Gerbidon, mise en scène Jacques Ardouin, réalisation Pierre Sabbagh, théâtre Marigny
 1978 : Au théâtre ce soir :Le Colonel Chabert d'après Honoré de Balzac, mise en scène Jean Meyer, réalisation Pierre Sabbagh, théâtre Marigny
 1978 : La Vie comme ça de Jean-Claude Brisseau : Pineau
 1980 : Au théâtre ce soir : Danse sans musique de Richard Puydorat et Albert Gray d'après Peter Cheyney, mise en scène René Clermont, réalisation Pierre Sabbagh, théâtre Marigny
 1980 : Les Faucheurs de marguerites de Marcel Camus
 1984 : Les Cinq Dernières Minutes, épisode La Quadrature des cercles de Jean-Pierre Richard

Theatre 

 1962 : Les Oiseaux rares de Renée Hoste, mise en scène Alfred Pasquali, théâtre Montparnasse
 1968 : Notre petite ville de Thornton Wilder, mise en scène Raymond Rouleau, théâtre Hébertot
 1969 : Le monde est ce qu'il est d'Alberto Moravia, mise en scène Pierre Franck, théâtre des Célestins, théâtre de l'Œuvre
 1971 : Boeing Boeing de Marc Camoletti, mise en scène Christian-Gérard, Comédie-Caumartin : Robert
 1972 : Folie douce de Jean-Jacques Bricaire et Maurice Lasaygues, mise en scène Michel Roux, théâtre Marigny
 1974 : Le Sexe faible d'Édouard Bourdet, mise en scène Jean-Laurent Cochet, théâtre de l'Athénée
 1974 : Le Siècle des lumières de Claude Brulé, mise en scène Jean-Laurent Cochet, théâtre du Palais-Royal
 1975 : Le Chasseur français de Boris Vian, mise en scène Pierre Perroux, théâtre Présent
 1976 : L'École des cocottes de Paul Armont et Marcel Gerbidon, mise en scène Jacques Ardouin, théâtre Hébertot
 1977 : Le Sexe faible d'Édouard Bourdet, mise en scène Jean Meyer, théâtre des Célestins
 1978 : Le Colonel Chabert d'après Honoré de Balzac, mise en scène Jean Meyer, théâtre des Célestins

Dubbing

Film

Movies 

 As Christopher Walken : (39 films)
 La Porte du paradis (1980) : Nathan D. Champion
 Brainstorm (1983) : Dr Michael Anthony Brace
 Dead Zone (1983) : Johnny Smith
 Dangereusement vôtre (1985) : Max Zorin
 Comme un chien enragé (1986) : Brad Whitewood Sr.
 Biloxi Blues (1988) : le sergent Merwin J. Toomey
 Hollywood Mistress (1992) : Warren Zell
 Scam (1993) : Jack Shancks
 Wayne's World 2 (1993) : Bobby Cahn
 The Prophecy (1995) : Gabriel
 Dernières heures à Denver (1995) : "Le manipulateur"
 Meurtre en suspens (1995) : M. Smith
 Touch (1997) : Bill Hill
 Excess Baggage (1997) : Raymond Perkins
 La Souris (1997) : Caeser, l'exterminateur
 The Prophecy 2 (1998) : Gabriel
 The Prophecy 3: The Ascent (2000) : Gabriel
 Les Opportunistes (2000) : Victor "Vic" Kelly
 Joe La Crasse (2001) : Clem
 Couple de stars (2001) : Hal Weidmann
 L'Affaire du collier (2001) : Cagliostro
 L'Amour, six pieds sous terre (2002) : Frank Featherbed
 Les Country Bears (2002) : Reed Thimple
 Amours troubles (2003) : détective Stanley Jacobellis
 Kangourou Jack (2003) : Sal Maggio
 Bienvenue dans la jungle (2003) : Travis
 Envy (2004) : J-Man
 Man on Fire (2004) : Rayburn
 Et l'homme créa la femme (2004) : Mike Willington
 Click : Télécommandez votre vie (2006) : Morty
 Man of the Year (2006) : Jack Menken
 Irish Gangster (2011) : Alex Birns
 Sept psychopathes (2012) : Hans
 Jersey Boys (2014) : Angelo « Gyp » DeCarlo
 Joe La Crasse 2 : Un bon gros loser (2015) : Clem
 One More Time (2015) : Paul Lombard
 Eddie the Eagle (2016) : Warren Sharp
 Ma vie de chat (2016) : Felix Purrkins
 Mon âme sœur (2018) : Myron
 As Donald Sutherland : (27 films)
 Crackers (1984) : Weslake
 Le Carrefour des innocents (1989) : Dr Charles Loftis
 Une saison blanche et sèche (1989) : Ben du Toit
 Six degrés de séparation (1993) : John Flanders Kettridge
 Free Money (1998) : Juge Rolf Rausenberg
 Virus (1999) : Capitaine Robert Everton
 L'Art de la guerre (2000) : Douglas Thomas
 1943, l'ultime révolte (2001) : Adam Czerniaków
 Sur le chemin de la guerre (2002) : Clark Clifford
 L'Affaire des cinq lunes (2003) : juge Rosario Saracini
 Braquage à l'italienne (2003) : John Bridger
 Des gens impitoyables (2005) : Ogden C. Osborne
 Orgueil et Préjugés (2005) : M. Bennett
 American Haunting (2005) : John Bell
 Demande à la poussière (2006) : Hellfrick
 À cœur ouvert (2007) : le juge Raines
 L'Amour de l'or (2008) : Nigel Honeycutt
 L'Aigle de la Neuvième Légion (2011) : Aquila
 Comment tuer son boss ? (2011) : Jack Pellit
 Le Flingueur (2011) : Harry McKenna
 Hunger Games (2012) : président Corolianus Snow
 Hunger Games : L'Embrasement (2013) : président Snow
 The Best Offer (2013) : Billy
 The Calling (2014) : père Price
 Hunger Games : La Révolte, partie 1 (2014) : président Snow
 Hunger Games : La Révolte, partie 2 (2015) : président Snow
 Forsaken (2015) : le révérend Clayton
 As James Caan : (23 films)
 Objectif Lune (1968) (doublage tardif de 2013) : Lee Stegler
 Le Parrain (1972) : Santino « Sonny » Corleone (1er doublage)
 La Chasse aux dollars (1973) : Dick Kanipsia
 Le Parrain 2 (1974) : Sonny Corleone (1er doublage)
 Funny Lady (1975) : Billy Rose
 Rollerball (1975) : Jonathan E.
 Tueur d'élite (1975) : Mike Loken
 Un pont trop loin (1977) : le sergent Eddie Dohun
 Le Souffle de la tempête (1978) : Frank « Buck » Athearn
 L'Impossible Témoin (1980) : Thomas Hacklin Jr.
 Le Solitaire (1981) : Frank
 Jardins de pierre (1987) : Clell Hazard
 Futur immédiat, Los Angeles 1991 (1988) : Matthew Sykes
 Misery (1990) : Paul Sheldon
 Flesh and Bone (1993) : Roy Sweeney
 Grand Nord (1996) : Sean McLennon
 Way of the Gun (2000) : Joe Sarno
 City of Ghosts (2002) : Marvin
 Jericho Mansions (2003) : Leonard Grey
 Elfe (2003) : Walter
 New York, I Love You (2008) : M. Riccoli
 Braquage à New York (2010) : Max Saltzman
 Crazy Dad (2012) : père McNally
 As Chuck Norris : (21 films)
 La Fureur du dragon (1972) : Colt
 Les Casseurs (1977) : John David "J.D." Dawes
 La Fureur du juste (1980) : Scott James
 Dent pour dent (1981) : Sean Kane
 Œil pour œil (1983) : J.J. McQuade
 Portés disparus (1984) : James Braddock
 Portés disparus 2 (1985) : James Braddock
 Invasion U.S.A. (1985) : Matt Hunter
 Delta Force (1986) : Scott McCoy
 Le Temple d'or (1986) : Max Donigan
 Portés disparus 3 (1988) : James Braddock
 Héros (1988) : Danny O'Brien
 Delta Force 2 (1990) : Scott McCoy
 L'Arme secrète (1991) : Garrett/Grogan
 Sidekicks (1992) : lui-même
 Hellbound (1994) : Frank Shatter
 Chien d'élite (1995) : Jack Wilder
 L'Esprit de la forêt (1996) : Jeremiah McKenna (version TV)
 Dodgeball ! Même pas mal ! (2004) : lui-même
 Le Sang du diamant (2005) : John Shepherd
 Expendables 2 : Unité spéciale (2012) : Booker
 As Jeremy Irons : (9 films)
 Le Mystère von Bülow (1990) : Claus von Bülow
 Fatale (1992) : Stephen Fleming
 Une journée en enfer (1995) : Simon Peter Gruber
 La Panthère rose 2 (2009) : Alonso Avelladena
 Margin Call (2011) : John Tuld
 High-Rise (2015) : Anthony Royal
 Batman v Superman : L'Aube de la Justice (2016) : Alfred Pennyworth
 Assassin's Creed (2016) : Dr Alan Rikkin
 Justice League (2017) : Alfred Pennyworth
 As Warren Beatty : (8 films)
 Reds (1981) : John Silas Reed
 Ishtar (1987) : Lyle Rogers
 Dick Tracy (1990) : Dick Tracy
 In Bed with Madonna (1991) : lui-même
 Bugsy (1991) : Bugsy Siegel
 Bulworth (1998) : Jay Billington Bulworth
 Potins mondains et amnésies partielles (2001) : Porter Stoddard
 L'Exception à la règle (2016) : Howard Hughes
 As Kris Kristofferson : (8 films)
 Blade (1998) : Abraham Whistler
 Blade 2 (2002) : Abraham Whistler
 Blade: Trinity (2004) : Abraham Whistler
 Les Copains des neiges (2008) : Talon (voix)
 Points de rupture (2008) : Randall
 Ce que pensent les hommes (2009) : Ken Murphy
 Bloodworth (en) (2010) : E. F. Bloodworth
 L'Incroyable Histoire de Winter le dauphin 2 (2014) : Reed Haskett
 As Harry Dean Stanton : (7 films)
 De l'or pour les braves (1970) : Willard
 Slam Dance (1987) : Benjamin Smiley
 She's So Lovely (1997) : Tony 'Shorty' Russo
 The Pledge (2001) : Floyd Cage
 This Must Be the Place (2011) : Robert Plath
 Avengers (2012) : le gardien du hangar détruit
 Le Dernier Rempart (2013) : le fermier
 As Harvey Keitel : (7 films)
 Mafia Salad (1986) : Bobby Dilea
 Une nuit en enfer (1996) : Jacob Fuller
 Petits meurtres entre nous (1996) : George
 Cop Land (1997) : Ray Donlan
 Benjamin Gates et le Trésor des Templiers (2004) : Peter Sadusky
 Benjamin Gates et le Livre des secrets (2007) : Peter Sadusky
 Le Congrès (2013) : Al
 As John Hurt  : (6 films)
 La Nuit de l'évasion (1982) : Peter Strelzyk
 Partners (1982) : Kerwin
 1984 (1984) : Winston Smith
 Scandal (1989) : Stephen Ward
 Dead Man (1995) : John Scholfield
 Brighton Rock (2010) : Phil Corkery
 Les Immortels (2011) : le vieil homme
 As Elliott Gould : (6 films)
 Ocean's Eleven (2001) : Reuben Tishkoff
 Ocean's Twelve (2004) : Reuben Tishkoff
 Ocean's Thirteen (2007) : Reuben Tishkoff
 Contagion (2011) : Dr Ian Sussman
 Le Noël de mes rêves (2012) : Sam Finkelstein
 Ocean's 8 (2018) : Reuben Tishkoff
 As Dennis Hopper : (6 films)
 Une trop belle cible (1990) : Milo
 Search and Destroy (1995) : Dr Luther Waxling
 Basquiat (1996) : Bruno Bischofberger
 Jesus' Son (en) (1999) : Bill
 Coup de maître (2000) : Gianni Ponti
 Les Hommes de main (2001) : Benny Chains
 Peter Fonda dans : (5 films)
 Easy Rider (1969) : Wyatt
 Les Mercenaires (1976) : Mike Bradley
 L'Or de la vie (1997) : Ulee Jackson
 Bande de sauvages (2007) : Damien Blade
 Les Anges de Boston 2 (2009) : The Roman
 As Scott Glenn : (5 films)
 Training Day (2001) : Roger
 Écrire pour exister (2007) : Steve Gruwell
 W. : L'Improbable Président (2008) : Donald Rumsfeld
 Sucker Punch (2011) : le Sage
 Paperboy (2012) : W.W. Jansen
 As Stacy Keach : (5 films)
 Chicago Overcoat (2009) : Ray Berkowski
 Truth : Le Prix de la vérité (2015) : Bill Burkett
 Cell (2016) : Charles Ardai
 Gold (2017) : Clive Coleman
 Gotti (2018) : Aniello Dellacroce
 As Ian McShane : (4 films)
 Salaud (1971) : Wolfe Lissner
 La Cible hurlante (1972) : Birdy Williams
 Scoop (2006) : Joe Strumble
 Pirates des Caraïbes : La Fontaine de jouvence (2011) : capitaine Edward Teach / Barbe-Noire
 As Anthony Perkins : (4 films)
 Quelqu'un derrière la porte (1971) : Laurence Jeffries
 Les Loups de haute mer (1979) : Lou Kramer
 Psychose 2 (1983) : Norman Bates
 Psychose 3 (1986) : Norman Bates
 As Sam Elliott : (4 films)
 The Alibi (2006) : The Mormon
 À la croisée des mondes : La Boussole d'or (2007) : Lee Scoresby
 Où sont passés les Morgan ? (2009) : Clay Wheeler
 In the Air (2009) : Maynard Finch
 As Peter Coyote :
 A Grande Arte (1991) : Mandrake
 Docteur Patch (1998) : Bill Davis
 Northfork (2003) : Eddie
 As Peter Simonischek :
 Rouge rubis (2013) : Comte Saint-Germain
 Bleu saphir (2014) : Comte Saint-Germain
 Vert émeraude (2016) : Comte Saint-Germain
 As Richard Jordan :
 Yakuza (1974) : Dusty
 Le Secret de mon succès (1987) : Howard Prescott
 As Michael Murphy :
 Manhattan (1979) : Yale
 L'Année de tous les dangers (1982) : Pete Curtis
 As Paul Gleason :
 The Breakfast Club (1985) : Richard Vernon
 Sex Academy (2001) : Richard Vernon
 As Lance Henriksen :
 Aliens, le retour (1986) : Bishop (scène supplémentaire de la version longue)
 Chasse à l'homme (1993) : Emil Fouchon
 As John Mahoney :
 Éclair de lune (1987) : Perry
 Les Filous (1987) : Moe Adams
 As Burt Reynolds :
 Malone, un tueur en enfer (1987) : Malone
 King Rising, au nom du roi (2007) : Roi Konreid
 As Terence Stamp :
 Le Sicilien (1987) : Prince Borsa
 Song for Marion (2012) : Arthur Harris
 As Tom Skerritt :
 Texas Rangers : La Revanche des justiciers (2001) : Richard Dukes
 Whiteout (2009) : Dr Fury
 As Ron Leibman :
 Auto Focus (2002) : Lenny
 Garden State (2004) : Dr Cohen
 As Gene Hackman :
 Le Maître du jeu (2003) : Rankin Finch
 Bienvenue à Mooseport (2004) : Monroe Cole
 As Geoffrey Lewis :
 Blueberry, l'expérience secrète (2004) : Greg Sullivan
 The Devil's Rejects (2005) : Roy Sullivan
 As Peter O'Toole :
 Lassie (2005) : Duke
 Stardust, le mystère de l'étoile (2007) : le roi de Stormhold
 As Alan Alda :
 Le Casse de Central Park (2011) : Arthur Shaw
 Peace, Love et plus si affinités (2012) : Carvin
 Others :
 1965 : Super 7 appelle le Sphinx : Martin Stevens dit « Super 7 » (Roger Browne)
 1966 : La Curée : Maxime Saccard (Peter McEnery)
 1967 : Tire encore si tu peux : l'étranger métis (Tomás Milián)
 1968 : Barbarella : l'Ange (John Phillip Law)
 1968 : Duffy, le renard de Tanger : l'espagnol, fournisseur d'armes (Tutte Lemkow)
 1968 : Les Feux de l'enfer : Greg Parker (Jim Hutton)
 1968 : Chacun pour soi : Manolo Sanchez (George Hilton)
 1969 : Fleur de Cactus : Igor Sullivan (Rick Lenz)
 1969 : Sept hommes pour Tobrouk : Charlie (Fabrizio Moroni)
 1969 : À l'aube du cinquième jour : Enseigne Bruno Grauber (Franco Nero)
 1970 : Airport : le jeune passager à lunettes[Qui ?]
 1970 : Les Cicatrices de Dracula : Simon Carlson (Dennis Waterman)
 1970 : La Fille de Ryan : commandant Randolph Doryan (Christopher Jones)
 1970 : Campus : Jake (Harrison Ford)
 1971 : Le Dossier Anderson : Spencer (Dick Anthony Williams)
 1971 : Ce plaisir qu'on dit charnel : Jonathan Fuerst (Jack Nicholson)
 1971 : Les Chiens de paille : Harry Niles (David Warner)
 1971 : Big Jake : Michael McCandles (Christopher Mitchum)
 1971 : Les Cavaliers : Mukhi (David de Keyser)
 1972 : Cosa Nostra : Buster (Franco Borelli)
 1972 : Massacre : Dominic Hoffo (Rip Torn)
 1973 : Mondwest : un technicien (Robert Patten)
 1973 : Complot à Dallas : Tim (Colby Chester)
 1973 : L'Exécuteur noir : l'inspecteur Reynolds (Brock Peters)
 1974 : Flesh Gordon : le prince Pédalo (Lance Larsen)
 1975 : Supervixens : Clint Ramsey (Charles Pitts)
 1975 : La Trahison (film, 1975) : Charles Lord (Timothy Dalton)
 1976 : Le Voyage des damnés : le premier officier (David Daker)
 1976 : C'est arrivé entre midi et trois heures : M. Foster (Howard Brunner)
 1977 : Annie Hall : l'homme au cinéma (Russell Horton)
 1977 : La Dernière Vague : David Burton (Richard Chamberlain)
 1978 : Le Jeu de la puissance : Colonel Hakim[Qui ?]
 1978 : La Fureur du danger : Roger Deal (Robert Klein)
 1978 : Sauvez le Neptune : Lieutenant Phillips (Christopher Reeve)
 1978 : Le Chat qui vient de l'espace : M. Stallwood (Roddy McDowall)
 1978 : La Grande Bataille : le chef du commando de parachutistes (Giacomo Rossi Stuart)
 1978 : Les Sept Cités d'Atlantis : Atmir (Michael Gothard)
 1978 : Mon nom est Bulldozer : un soldat (Riccardo Pizzuti)
 1979 : Le Cavalier électrique : Dietrich (James B. Sikking)
 1979 : Yanks : John (William Devane)
 1980 : Garçonne : Paul (Eric Allen)
 1980 : Le Lion du désert : le prince Amedeo (Sky du Mont)
 1981 : New York 1997 : Romero (Frank Doubleday)
 1982 : Le Choix de Sophie : Nathan (Kevin Kline)
 1982 : Frances : Clifford Odets (Jeffrey DeMunn)
 1982 : Gandhi : Pandit Jawaharlal Nehru (Roshan Seth)
 1982 : Grease 2 : M. Stuart (Tab Hunter)
 1982 : Les Guerriers du Bronx : Hot Dog (Christopher Connelly)
 1983 : Vendicator : Nesfero (Johnny Monteiro)
 1983 : Wargames : M. Lightman (William Bogert)
 1984 : Le Bounty : John Fryer (Daniel Day-Lewis)
 1984 : Il était une fois en Amérique : James Conway O'Donnell (Treat Williams) (1er doublage)
 1984 : Birdy : M. Columbato (Sandy Baron) (1er doublage)
 1984 : Marathon Killer : Pete Canfield (Ronny Cox)
 1985 : Le Secret de la pyramide : le professeur Rathe (Anthony Higgins)
 1985 : D.A.R.Y.L. : Andy Richardson (Michael McKean) (1er doublage)
 1985 : Santa Claus : BZ (John Lithgow)
 1985 : L'Année du dragon : Joey Tai (John Lone)
 1985 : Tutti Frutti : Frère Constance (Jay Patterson)
 1985 : Natty Gann : Sol Gann (Ray Wise)
 1985 : Teen Wolf : Harold Howard (James Hampton)
 1986 : Peggy Sue s'est mariée : Jack Kelcher (Don Murray)
 1986 : Les Coulisses du pouvoir : le candidat sénateur de l'Ohio Jerome Cade (J. T. Walsh)
 1986 : Highlander : Ron Berglas (Erik Powell)
 1986 : Le Flic était presque parfait : le marchand d'armes (Austin Pendleton)
 1986 : À propos d'hier soir... : Mr. Favio (George DiCenzo)
 1987 : Extrême préjudice : Larry McRose (Clancy Brown)
 1988 : Élémentaire, mon cher... Lock Holmes : l'inspecteur Lestrade (Jeffrey Jones)
 1988 : Vendredi 13, chapitre 7 : Un nouveau défi : le docteur Crews (Terry Kiser)
 1988 : Y a-t-il un flic pour sauver la reine ? : Vincent Ludwig (Ricardo Montalbán)
 1988 : La Septième Prophétie : le révérend (John Heard)
 1988 : Les Clowns tueurs venus d'ailleurs : le shérif Curtis Mooney (John Vernon)
 1988 : Colors : Melindez (Rudy Ramos)
 1989 : Calme blanc : le docteur (George Shevtsov)
 1989 : L'Amour est une grande aventure : Jake Fedderman (Joel Brooks)
 1989 : L'Aventure extraordinaire d'un papa peu ordinaire : Domingo Villaverde (Jean Carlo Simancas)
 1990 : Henry et June : Henry Miller (Fred Ward)
 1990 : Le Bûcher des vanités : Sir Gerald Moore (Robert Stephens)
 1990 : L'Exorciste, la suite : le docteur Temple (Scott Wilson)
 1990 : Fire Birds : Brad Little (Tommy Lee Jones)
 1990 : Affaires privées : Nicholas Hollander (Mike Figgis)
 1991 : Le Festin nu : Bill Lee (Peter Weller)
 1991 : La Manière forte : Party Crasher (Stephen Lang)
 1991 : Ombres et Brouillard : l'étrangleur (Michael Kirby)
 1992 : Bob Roberts : Lukas Hart III (Alan Rickman)
 1992 : Christophe Colomb : La découverte : Ferdinand II d'Aragon (Tom Selleck)
 1992 : La Loi de la nuit : Phil Nasseros (Cliff Gorman)
 1993 : Tombstone : Curly Bill Brocius (Powers Boothe)
 1993 : Le Concierge du Bradbury : Gene Salvatore (Dan Hedaya)
 1993 : Madame Doubtfire : Stuart Dunmeyer (Pierce Brosnan)
 1993 : L'Extrême Limite : Max Waxman (Jonathan Banks)
 1996 : Du Vent dans les saules : le chef des belettes (Anthony Shyer)
 1996 : Lame de fond : Francis Beaumont (David Selby)
 1997 : Tennessee Valley : Reece McHenry (Sam Shepard)
 1997 : Dans l'ombre de Manhattan : Morgenstern (Ron Leibman)
 1997 : Le Nouvel Espion aux pattes de velours : Mr. Flint (Dean Jones)
 1998 : Un tueur pour cible : Terence Wei (Kenneth Tsang)
 1998 : Still Crazy : De retour pour mettre le feu : Ray Simms (Bill Nighy)
 1998 : Préjudice : Al Eustis (Sydney Pollack)
 1999 : Man on the Moon : Ed Weinberger (Peter Bonerz)
 1999 : Agnes Browne : Tom Jones (dans son propre rôle)
 1999 : Anna et le Roi : général Alak (Randall Duk Kim)
 2000 : Un thé avec Mussolini : Mussolini (Claudio Spadaro)
 2002 : American Party : Vance Wilder Sr. (Tim Matheson)
 2002 : Influences : Cary Launer (Ryan O'Neal)
 2002 : Le Club des empereurs : Sénateur Bell (Harris Yulin)
 2004 : Melinda et Melinda : Max (Larry Pine)
 2004 : Tout ou rien : Vincent « Vince » Hopgood (Paul Hogan)
 2005 : The Weather Man : Robert Spritzel (Michael Caine)
 2005 : A History of Violence : Carl Fogarty (Ed Harris)
 2006 : The Holiday : Dustin Hoffman (dans son propre rôle)
 2006 : Jugez-moi coupable : Nick Calabrese (Alex Rocco)
 2006 : Mon vrai père et moi : Doug Clayton (Edward Herrmann)
 2007 : Hot Fuzz : le révérend Philip Shooter (Paul Freeman)
 2007 : Shoot 'Em Up : Que la partie commence : Hammerson (Stephen McHattie)
 2007 : Kill Bobby Z : Johnson (Keith Carradine)
 2007 : Juno : Mac McGuff (J. K. Simmons)
 2007 : The Lookout : Robert Pratt (Bruce McGill)
 2008 : Rien que pour vos cheveux : le père de Zohan (Shelley Berman)
 2008 : L'Échange : Sammy Hahn (Geoff Pierson)
 2008 : Day Watch : Zavulon (Viktor Verjbitski)
 2009 : Fanboys : lui-même (William Shatner)
 2009 : Hannah Montana, le film : M. Bradley (Barry Bostwick)
 2010 : Double identity : l'ambassadeur Abilov (Harry Anichkin)
 2011 : Hobo with a Shotgun : le chef de la police (Jeremy Akerman)
 2013 : Wolverine : Le Combat de l'immortel : Yashida/Samouraï d'Argent (Hal Yamanouchi)
 2014 : X-Men: Days of Future Past : sénateur Brickman (Michael Lerner)
 2015 : Cendrillon : le Roi (Derek Jacobi)
 2016 : Joyeuse fête des mères : Lance Wallace (Hector Elizondo)
 2017 : Death Note : le capitaine Russel (Michael Shamus Wiles)

Animation 

 1965 : Sur la piste de l'Ouest sauvage : Le cheval de la Terreur
 1985 : Taram et le Chaudron magique : le Seigneur des Ténèbres (2e doublage)
 1993 : L'Étrange Noël de monsieur Jack : Dr Finkelstein
 1994 : Le Roi lion : Scar (voix initiale)
 1998 : Les Razmoket, le film : Jean-Roger, Charles
 2000 : Les Razmoket à Paris, le film : Jean-Roger, Charles
 2001 : Barbie Casse-Noisette : commandant Menthe
 2002 : Barbie, princesse Raiponce : le roi Frederick
 2003 : Les Razmoket rencontrent les Delajungle : Jean-Roger, Charles
 2004 : Balto 3 : Sur l'aile du vent : Kirby
 2007 : Ratatouille : Anton Ego
 2010 : Alpha et Oméga : Tony
 2011 : Eden : Dieu
 2013 : Ma maman est en Amérique, elle a rencontré Buffalo Bill : Mr. Ferret
 2015 : Le Petit Prince : le professeur
 2015 : Objectif Lune : Frank
 2016 : La Ligue des justiciers vs. les Teen Titans : Ra's Al Ghul
 2017 : Batman vs Double-Face : Alfred Pennyworth

Short films 

 2017 : On s'est fait doubler ! : l'agent stoïque (Jean-Gilles Barbier)

Television

Telefilms 

 Tom Skerritt dans :
 Cœurs en feu (1992) : Jarrett Mattison
 La prophétie de la haine (1997) : Steve Riordan
 Les secrets du silence (1997) : Norm Jenkins
 Aftershock : Tremblement de terre à New York (1999) : Thomas Ahearn
 La guérison du cœur (2002) : Johnny Pinkley
 Cyclone Catégorie 7 : Tempête mondiale (2005) : le colonel Mike Davis
 La Colline aux adieux (2005) : Fritz Grier
 Mammouth, la résurrection (2006) : Simon Abernathy
 Désolation (2006) : John Edward Marinville
 Alerte tsunamis (2007) : Victor Bannister
 Un amour ne meurt jamais (2011) : Jack Conners
 Donald Sutherland dans :
 Quicksand: No Escape (1992) : Murdoch
 Citizen X (1995) : colonel Mikhail Fetisov
 CSS Hunley, le premier sous-marin (1999) : général Beauregard
 Trafic d'innocence (2005) : agent Bill Meehan
 Moby Dick (2011) : père Mapple
 L'Île au trésor (2012) : Flint
 Winston Rekert dans :
 L'amour en cadeau (2003) : Joe Cunningham
 L'étoile de Noël (2004) : William Simon
 Le Secret de Hidden Lake (2006) : Frank Dolan
 Tornades sur New York (2008) : Dr Lars Liggenhorn
 L'enfer du feu (2008) : Hank
 L'aventure de Noël (2009) : Nick Stanley
 Chuck Norris dans :
 La Colère du tueur (1998) : Jake Fallon
 L'Homme du président (2000) : Joshua McCord
 Action Force (2002) : Joshua McCord
 Walker, Texas Ranger : La Machination (2005) : Cordell Walker
 George Hamilton dans :
 Danielle Steel : Disparu (1995) : Malcolm Patterson
 Scandale à Hollywood (2004) : Woody Prentice
 Un Noël trop cool (2004) : Père Noël
 Stacy Keach dans :
 Ciel de glace (2003) : Pete Crane
 Le Trésor de Barbe-Noire (2006) : Benjamin Hornigold
 Nanny Express (2008) : révérend MacGregor
 Barry Bostwick dans :
 L'Amour à l'horizon (2007) : Martin Harper
 Tempête à Las Vegas (2013) : Sal
 Romance sous les étoiles (2015) : Walt
 Cal Bartlett dans :
 Turbulences en plein vol (2010) : général Caldwell
 Portées disparues (2013) : le shérif
 Les doutes de Scarlett (2016) : le maire Ron Anderson
 Art Hindle dans :
 Une proie certaine (2011) : l'agent spécial Leonard Heisman
 Le Bébé de Noël (2012) : Christopher Davidson
 Dévorée par l'ambition (2013) : Ralph Mickelson
 Ray Baker dans :
 Rapt (1986) : Donald F. Donald
 44 minutes de terreur (2003) : Harris
 Christopher Walken dans :
 Le Combat de Sarah (1993) : Jacob Witting
 Arnaques en Jamaïque (1993) : Jack Shanks
 Dennis Hopper dans :
 Chasseur de sorcières (1994) : Harry Philippe Lovecraft
 Samson et Dalila (1996) : le général Tariq
 James Brolin dans :
 Panique sur le vol 285 (1996) : Ron Showman
 Un mariage malgré tout ! (2006) : gouverneur Conrad Welling
 Elliott Gould dans :
 Romance millésimée (2009) : Paul Browning
 La Cerise sur le gâteau de mariage (2014) : Max Barnworth
 Others:
 1972 : Le Loup de la nuit : Andrew Rodanthe (Bradford Dillman)
 1985 : Blackout : L'obsession d'un flic : Allen Devlin (Keith Carradine)
 1985 : Meurtre au crépuscule : Roland (Frederick Coffin)
 1985 : Perdus dans la ville : Marty Campbell (Richard Thomas)
 1985 : Cœur en sursis : Larry Weisman (Jeffrey DeMunn)
 1986 : La loi du silence : le commandant Kendall Laird (John Lithgow)
 1986 : Agent orange : Clifton (Terrance Ellis)
 1987 : L'Impossible Alibi : Harry Nash (Ed Harris)
 1988 : Les passions oubliées : Michael Bredon (Christopher Cazenove)
 1988 : Jack l'Éventreur : sergent George Godley (Lewis Collins)
 1988 : Les Voyageurs de l'infini : commandant Jacob Brown (Duncan Regehr)
 1989 : On a tué mes enfants : Frank Joziak (John Shea)
 1989 : La rage de vivre : Wayne (Joseph Hacker)
 1990 : Enterré vivant : Cortland 'Cort' van Owen (William Atherton)
 1990 : Mort au sommet : Robert « Bob » Craig (John Gowans)
 1991 : Confusion tragique : Ernest Twigg (John M. Jackson)
 1992 : Cauchemar en plein jour : Sean (Christopher Reeve)
 1992 : Double verdict : Warren Blackburn (Peter Strauss)
 1993 : De parents inconnus : Del Smith (Gordon Clapp)
 1993 : L'Affaire Amy Fisher : Désignée coupable : le juge Marvin Goodman (Mort Sertner)
 1994 : Dans le piège de l'oubli : Dr Winslow (Paul Sorvino)
 1994 : Honore ton père et ta mère : la véritable histoire des meurtres de Menendez : Jose Menéndez (James Farentino)
 1994 : L'Homme aux deux épouses : Martin Hightower (Peter Weller)
 1995 : La part du mensonge : Stuart Quinn (David Dukes)
 1996 : Les Voyages de Gulliver : empereur de Liliput (Peter O'Toole)
 1996 : Péchés oubliés : Dr. Richard Ofshe (William Devane)
 1998 : La Proie du collectionneur : capitaine Swaggert (Bruce Dern)
 1999 : La ville des légendes de l'Ouest : shérif Forrest (Sam Shepard)
 1999 : Double Trahison : un médecin de l’hôpital (?)
 2000 : Point limite : le président (Richard Dreyfuss)
 2000 : Un intrus dans la famille : Dr Fortunato (Ric Reid)
 2001 : Une vie pour deux : Steven Hastings (Peter Coyote)
 2001 : La Ballade de Lucy Whipple : Jonas Scatter (Bruce McGill)
 2002 : Blood Crime : shérif Morgan McKenna (James Caan)
 2003 : Ultimate Limit : Pacheco Laval (Stephen J. Cannell)
 2005 : La rose noire : Martin Darius / Peter Lake (Scott Glenn)
 2006 : The Black Hole, le trou noir : le général Ryker (David Selby)
 2008 : 24: Redemption : Jonas Hodges (Jon Voight)
 2010 : Une lueur d'espoir : Jess Sanford (Sam Elliott)
 2010 : La femme de trop : le commentateur radio (Joel Haberli)
 2011 : Planète Terre en danger : Rothman (Bruce Davison)
 2011 : Allemagne 1918 : général Walther von Lüttwitz (Hans-Michael Rehberg)
 2011 : Un mariage en cadeau : le révérend Paul (John Colton)
 2012 : Coup de foudre à 3 temps : Drew (Chris Gillett)
 2012 : La Saison des amours : Jim Landon (Barry Van Dyke)
 2013 : Sa dernière course : Rudolf (Otto Mellies)
 2014 : Sous le charme de Noël : le père de Jenna (Ray Laska)
 2015 : Juste à temps pour Noël : l'homme à la calèche (William Shatner)
 2016 : L'envie d'être mère : Mikey (Shawn Lawrence)
 2016 : Une inquiétante infirmière : Wayne (John Novak)

TV series 

 Barry Bostwick dans :
 Spin City (1996-2002) : Randall Winston
 Lexx (1997) : Thodin (saison 1, épisode 1)
 Scrubs (2003) : M. Randolf (saison 3, épisode 9)
 New York, unité spéciale (2004-2007) : Oliver Gates
 Las Vegas (2005) : Martin (saison 3, épisode 11)
 Ce que j'aime chez toi (2005-2006) : Jack Tyler
 Ugly Betty (2008) : Roger Adams
 Supernatural (2009) : Jay (saison 4, épisode 12)
 Ghost Whisperer (2009) : Don Sullivan (saison 5, épisode 3)
 Nip/Tuck (2009) : Roger Payne (saison 6, épisode 1)
 Forgotten (2010) : Bill Ramey (saison 1, épisode 12)
 Glee (2010) : Tim Stanwick (saison 2, épisode 5)
 Cougar Town (2010-2014) : Roger Frank
 Scandal (2013) : Jerry Grant
 New Girl (2014) : Robert Goodwin (saison 4, épisode 11)
 Elliott Gould dans :
 Friends (1994-2003) : Jack Geller
 Shining (1997) : Stuart Ullman
 It's Like, You Know... (1999-2001) : lui-même
 Voilà ! (2000) : lui-même
 Las Vegas (2003) : le professeur (saison 1, épisode 4)
 Hercule Poirot (2005), épisode Le Train bleu Rufus van Aldin
 Les Maîtres de l'horreur (2006) : Barney (saison 2, épisode 7)
 Drop Dead Diva (2009) : Larry Baxter (saison 1, épisode 6)
 New York, police judiciaire (2009) : Stan Arkavy (saison 20, épisode 10)
 Les Experts (2010) : Earnest Boozell (saison 11, épisode 2)
 New York, unité spéciale (2012) : Walter Thompkins (saison 14, épisode 8)
 Hawaii 5-0 (2016) : Leo Hirsch (saison 6, épisode 23)
 Doubt (2017) : Isaiah Roth
 9JKL (2017-2018) : Harry Roberts
 Stacy Keach dans :
 Au-delà du réel : L'aventure continue (2000) : Cord van Owen (saison 6, épisode 2)
 Titus (2000-2002) : Ken Titus
 Prison Break (2005-2007) : Henry Pope
 Urgences (2007) : Mike Gates
 Meteor : Le Chemin de la destruction (2009) : shérif Crowe (mini-série)
 Lights Out (2011) : Robert Leary
 Enlisted (2014) : Patrick (saison 1, épisode 8)
 New York, unité spéciale (2014) : Orion Bauer (saison 16, épisode 2)
 NCIS : Nouvelle-Orléans (2015-2017) : Cassius Pride (1er voix, saisons 1 et 4)
 Blue Bloods (2016-2017) : le cardinal Kevin Kearns (1er voix, saisons 7 et 8)
 Papa a un plan (2016-2018) : Joe Burns (1er voix, saisons 1 et 2)
 Tom Skerritt dans :
 Dossiers brûlants (1974) : Robert W. Palmer (saison 1, épisode 7)
 Un drôle de shérif (1992-1996) : Jimmy Brock
 Will et Grace (2002) : Dr Jay Markus (saison 5, épisode 7)
 État d'alerte (2004) : directeur adjoint de la CIA Acton Sandman
 Fallen (2006) : Zeke
 Brothers and Sisters (2006-2009) : William Walker
 Dead Zone (2007) : Herb Smith (saison 6, épisode 13)
 FBI : Duo très spécial (2012) : Alan Mitchell (saison 3, épisode 14)
 The Good Wife (2014) : James Paisley
 Madam Secretary (2015) : Patrick McCord (saison 1, épisode 13)
 William Shatner dans :
 Troisième planète après le Soleil (1999-2000) : Grosse Tête Géante / Stone Phillips
 The Practice : Bobby Donnell et Associés (2004) : Denny Crane
 Boston Justice (2004-2008) : Denny Crane
 Psych : Enquêteur malgré lui (2011-2012) : Frank O’Hara
 Rookie Blue (2012) : Henry McLeod (saison 3, épisode 1)
 Les Enquêtes de Murdoch (2015) : Mark Twain (saison 9, épisode 2)
 Scott Paulin dans :
 JAG (2002-2003) : capitaine Johnson
 FBI : Portés disparus (2003) : Lawrence Metcalf (saison 1, épisode 16)
 NCIS : Enquêtes spéciales (2006) : capitaine Kevin Dorn (saison 3, épisode 20)
 Lie to Me (2009) : Gerald Cole (saison 1, épisode 1)
 NCIS : Los Angeles (2011) : Larry Basser (saison 3, épisode 6)
 Longmire (2012) : Ira Craig (saison 1, épisode 6)
 Donald Sutherland dans :
 Salem (2004) : Richard Straker
 Commander in Chief (2005-2006) : Nathan Templeton
 Dirty Sexy Money (2007-2009) : Patrick « Tripp » Darling III
 Les Piliers de la terre (2010) : Bartholomew de Shiring
 Crossing Lines (2013-2015) : Michael Dorn
 Trust (2018) : J. Paul Getty
 Ramy Zada dans :
 Dallas (1990-1991) : Johnny Dancer
 Le Juge de la nuit (1991-1992) : juge Nicholas Marshall
 Melrose Place (1995) : Martin Abbott
 X-Files : Aux frontières du réel (1999) : Joe Cutrona (saison 7, épisode 6)
 JAG (2004) : professeur Alessandro Selvaggio (saison 9, épisode 12)
 Chuck Norris dans :
 Walker, Texas Ranger (1993-2001) : Cordell Walker
 Le Successeur (1999) : Cordell Walker
 Le Flic de Shanghaï (2000) : Cordell Walker (saison 2, épisode 16)
 Jon Voight dans :
 Lonesome Dove : La Loi des justes (1993) : capitaine Woodrow F. Call
 24 heures chrono (2009) : Jonas Hodges
 Ray Donovan (2013-2017) : Mickey Donovan (1er voix, saisons 1 à 5)
 John Mahoney dans :
 Frasier (1993-2004) : Martin Crane
 Urgences (2006) : Bennett Cray (saison 13, épisode 3)
 Hot in Cleveland (2011) : Rusty « Roy » Banks
 Michael Nouri dans :
 Demain à la une (1998) : Stanley Hollenbeck (saison 3, épisode 10)
 New York, unité spéciale (1999) : Dallas Warner (saison 1, épisode 2)
 New York, section criminelle (2007) : Elder Roberts (saison 6, épisode 15)
 Alan Dale dans :
 The Practice : Bobby Donnell et Associés (2002) : juge Robert Brenford
 24 heures chrono (2003-2004) : vice-président Jim Prescott
 Californication (2011) : Lloyd Alan Philips Jr. (saison 4, épisode 7)
 Peter Coyote dans :
 The Inside : Dans la tête des tueurs (2005-2006) : Virgil « Web » Webster
 Los Angeles, police judiciaire (2010-2011) : le procureur Jerry Hardin
 Intelligence (2014) : Leland Strand
 Anthony Higgins dans :
 Londres, police judiciaire (2009) : Edward Connor (saison 1, épisode 5)
 Inspecteur Lewis (2009) : Franco (saison 3, épisode 4)
 Miss Marple (2010) : Comte Ludwig Von Stainach (saison 5, épisode 2)
 Don Murray dans :
 Côte Ouest (1979-1982) : William « Sid » Fairgaite
 Twin Peaks : The Return (2017) : Bushnell Mullins
 Kenneth Welsh dans :
 Au-delà du réel : L'aventure continue (1997) : Dr. Vasquez (saison 3, épisode 9)
 The Listener (2012) : Albert Jacoby (saison 3, épisode 11)
 Mathieu Carrière dans :
 Le Renard (1999) : Stefan Achatz (saison 23, épisode 4)
 Rex, chien flic (2000) : Pr. Paul Mandl (saison 6, épisode 8)
 Robert Curtis Brown dans :
 Veronica Mars (2005) : le juré chef d'industrie (saison 2, épisode 10)
 Shark (2007-2008) : Morgan Ride
 J. K. Simmons dans :
 The Closer (2005-2012) : Will Pope (J. K. Simmons)
 Raising Hope (2011) : Bruce Chance (saison 1, épisode 16)
 Matt Riedy dans :
 NCIS : Enquêtes spéciales (2007) : amiral Kenneth Kirkland (saison 5, épisode 8)
 Mad Men (2008) : Henry Wofford (saison 2, épisode 2)
 Howard Hesseman dans :
 Urgences (2007) : Dr James Broderick (saison 14, épisode 1)
 Les Experts (2011) : Dr Aden (saison 11, épisode 16)
 Bruce Davison dans :
 Ghost Whisperer (2009) : Josh Bedford (saison 4, épisode 23)
 Les Experts (2011) : Avery Tinsdale (saison 11, épisode 20)
 Michael Shamus Wiles dans :
 Breaking Bad (2009-2012) : le chef de la DEA
 Last Resort (2013) : général Macavoy (saison 1, épisode 11)
 John Hurt dans :
 Labyrinthe (2012) : Audric Baillard
 Panthers (2015) : Tom Kendle
 Dans Inspecteur Derrick :
 1983 : Arthur Dissmann (Horst Buchholz) (ép. 100 : Le chantage)
 1985 : Andreas Hessler (Gerd Böckmann (de)) (ép. 126 : Bavure)
 1987 : Conny de Mohl (Frank Hoffmann) (ép. 155 : Patrouille de nuit)
 1991 : Joachim Karau (Hanns Zischler) (ép. 202 : Des vies bouleversées)
 Others:
 1974 : Dossiers brûlants : lieutenant Jack Matteo (William Daniels) (saison 1, épisode 4)
 1976 / 1978 : Drôles de dames : Ted Kale (Kurt Grayson) (saison 1, épisode 1) / Frank Bartone (Cesare Danova) (saison 1, épisode 2) et Frank Howell (Dean Martin)
 1978 : Le Renard : Karl Markolm (Klausjürgen Wussow) (S02E04 : L'enfant de la haine)
 1978-1986 : La croisière s'amuse : Mike Andrews (Bob Seagren) (saison 1, épisode 19) / Mike Kelly (Michael Cole) / Wally (Jimmie Walker) (saison 3, épisode 12) / Bill Simmons (John Reilly) (saison 4, épisode 8) / Ron (Richard Gilliland) (saison 6, épisode 21) / Joe (Brodie Greer) (saison 8, épisode 9) et Michael Sawyer (John Astin)
 1978-1987 : Dallas : Gary Ewing (David Ackroyd) / le détective de Bobby (Ion Berger) (saison 6, épisode 16) / Frederick Hoskins (Allan Miller) / Gary Ewing (Ted Shackelford) (saison 9, épisode 1) et Mr. Barton (Josef Rainer)
 1979 : Le Renard : Hubertus Manz (Thomas Fritsch) (S03E08 : Le doute et la peur)
 1981-1982 : Flamingo Road : Michael Tyrone (David Selby)
 1981-1987 : Dynastie : Michael Culhane (Wayne Northrop)
 1982-1987 : Ricky ou la Belle Vie : Dexter Stuffins (Franklyn Seales)
 1984 : Sherlock Holmes : Charles Gorot (Nicholas Geake) (saison 1, épisode 3)
 1984-1987 : Arabesque : Peter Brill (Bert Convy) (épisode pilote) / Horace Lynchfield (Paul Sand) (saison 1, épisode 17) / Christopher Bundy (Bert Convy) (saison 2, épisode 19) / Gilbert Gaston (Robert Forster) (saison 2, épisode 21) et Avery Stone (Bradford Dillman) (saison 4, épisode 8)
 1984-1987 : Supercopter : Dr Robert Winchester (David Carradine) (saison 1, épisode 10) / Nick Kincaid (Eric Braeden) (saison 3, épisode 22) et Saint John Hawke (Barry Van Dyke)
 1985 : Kane & Abel : William Lowell Kane (Sam Neill) (mini-série)
 1986 : La Vengeance aux deux visages : Dr Dan Marshall (James Smilie)
 1986-1987 : La Vie des Botes : le père
 1987 : La Belle et la Bête : Henry Dutton (Paul Gleason) (saison 1, épisode 8)
 1987-1988 : Max Headroom : Edison Carter / Max Headroom (Matt Frewer)
 1988 : La noble maison : Lando Mata (Damien Thomas) (mini-série)
 1989 : Lonesome Dove : Woodrow F. Call (Tommy Lee Jones)
 1989-1991 : Hercule Poirot : l'inspecteur de police (Al Fiorentini) (saison 1, épisode 6) / Gregorie Rolf (Oliver Cotton) (saison 2, épisode 9) et James Ackerley (Andrew Burt) (saison 3, épisode 10)
 1990-1992 : Les Contes de la crypte : Jerry (Michael Ironside) (saison 2, épisode 7) / Dr Trask (Richard Thomas) (saison 2, épisode 15) / Charles McKenzie (Richard Jordan) (saison 3, épisode 12) / Dr Roberts (Don Michaelson) (saison 4, épisode 3) / Fred (Christopher Reeve) (saison 4, épisode 6) / Dr Alan Goetz (David Warner) (saison 4, épisode 7) et le lieutenant Jameson (Obba Babatundé) (saison 4, épisode 10)
 1990 : Hercule Poirot, épisode L'Aventure de l'Étoile de l'Ouest : Gregory Rolf (Oliver Cotton (en))
 1992 : Notre belle famille : Bob Gordon (Troy Shire) (saison 1, épisode 22)
 1993-1994 : La Caverne de la rose d'or : Tarabas (Nicholas Rogers) ; voix additionnelles
 1993-1996 : New York Police Blues : l'inspecteur John Kelly (David Caruso) / Mike Biaggi (Lou Casal) (saison 3, épisode 3) / Patsy Ferrara (Brad Sullivan) (saison 3, épisode 7) / Theodore Tierney (Michael Waltman) et Carl (Robert Sutton) (saison 3, épisode 13) et Victor Charels (John Curless) (saison 4, épisode 5)
 1994-1995 : Mission top secret : Neville Savage (Shane Briant)
 1994-2003 : Friends : le réalisateur (James Burrows) (saison 1, épisode 6) / Mr. Heckles (Larry Hankin) (saison 1, épisode 7) / Burt (Richard Roat) (saison 6, épisode 18) / l'acteur (Paul Logan) (saison 9, épisode 11) et le réalisateur (Joe Colligan) (saison 9, épisode 19)
 1995-1996 : Melrose Place : Vic Munson (Page Moseley)
 1995-1999 : Bugs : Dent (Richard Durden) / Dr Talbot (David Grant) (saison 2, épisode 10)
 1996 : L'Homme de nulle part : Robert Barton (Francis X. McCarthy) (saison 1, épisode 25)
 1996 : Chair de poule : Mr. Starkes (Peter Messaline)
 1996 : FX, effets spéciaux : lieutenant Stone (Richard Comar)
 1996-1998 : Au-delà du réel : L'aventure continue : Maculhaney (Alan Rachins) (saison 2, épisode 15) / le principal (Douglas Newell) (saison 3, épisode 14) et le pasteur à la télévision (Ed Evanko) (saison 4, épisode 7)
 1997-1998 : JAG : lieutenant Harmon Rabb (voix de Richard Crenna)
 1997-2002 : Dharma et Greg : Edward Montgomery (Mitchell Ryan)
 1998 : Seinfeld : le chauffeur du taxi de Elaine (Dayton Callie) (saison 9, épisode 20)
 1999-2002 : Charmed : Ben Bragg (Jim Antonio) (saison 2, épisode 7) et le père de Paige (Scott Wilkinson) (saison 4, épisode 10)
 2000-2003 : Un cas pour deux : Dieter Möhrlein (Wolfgang Packhäuser) (saison 20, épisode 7) / l'avocat de Kern (Franz Hanfstingl) (saison 21, épisode 1) / Karl Hoprecht (Michael Gwisdek) (saison 22, épisode 1) et Herr Winterberger (Peter Rauch) (saison 24, épisode 4)
 2001 : Alias : Karl Dreyer (Tobin Bell)
 2001 : Sept à la maison : le grand-père de Sarah (John Gowans) (saison 5, épisode 21)
 2001 : Commissaire Léa Sommer : Anton Kofler (Edgar M. Böhlke) (saison 5, épisode 1)
 2001-2002 : New York, unité spéciale : Darien Marshall (Simon Jones) (saison 2, épisode 17) et Craig Lambert (Craig Bockhorn) (saison 4, épisode 6)
 2002 : Do Over : Bill Larsen (Michael Milhoan)
 2002 : Les Nuits de l'étrange : Martin (Malcolm McDowell) (saison 1, épisode 25)
 2003-2007 : FBI : Portés disparus : Victor Fitzgerald (Ray Baker) et Leslie Warwick (David Birney) (saison 5, épisode 17)
 2003-2008 : Urgences : Bob Gilman (Michael Durrell) (saison 9, épisode 11) et Walter Perkins (Hal Holbrook)
 2003-2009 : Inspecteur Barnaby : Rupert Smythe-Webster (Ronald Pickup) (saison 6, épisode 4) / Tom (David Bradley) (saison 7, épisode 1) / Viv Marshall (Simon Armstrong) (saison 8, épisode 6) / John Farrow / Lahaie (David Burke) (saison 8, épisode 8) / Teddy Butler (John Franklyn-Robbins) (saison 9, épisode 3) / Henry Marwood (Dominic Jephcott) (saison 9, épisode 5) / Guy Sandys (Simon Williams) (saison 11, épisode 4) et Seth Comfort (Clive Russell) (saison 12, épisode 3)
 2003-2013 : NCIS : Enquêtes spéciales : le golfeur Ben (Robert Pine) (saison 1, épisode 5) et Norman Pittorino (Graham Beckel) (saison 10, épisode 18)
 2004 : Miss Marple : colonel Arthur Bantry (James Fox) (saison 1, épisode 1)
 2004 : Ash et Scribbs : Tim Gregson (Philip Martin Brown) (saison 1, épisode 4)
 2004 : Dead Zone : Max Kolchak (Serge Houde) (saison 3, épisode 9)
 2004 : Ma famille d'abord : Wayne Newton (lui-même) (saison 5, épisode 1)
 2004 / 2014 : Mon oncle Charlie : Harry Dean Stanton (lui-même) (saison 2, épisode 1) et Steve (Steve Lawrence) (saison 11, épisode 13)
 2005 : Joey : Benjamin Lockwood (John Larroquette)
 2005 : Killer Instinct : Robert Hale (Peter Strauss) (saison 1, épisode 6)
 2005-2008 : Supernatural : John Winchester (Jeffrey Dean Morgan)
 2006 : Power Rangers : Force mystique : Leanbow (Chris Graham)
 2006 : Desperate Housewives : Dr Barr (William Atherton)
 2007 : Cold Case : Affaires classées : Stan Williams (Perry King) (saison 4, épisode 13)
 2007 : Burn Notice : Mr. Pyne (Ray Wise)
 2007 : Entourage : Dennis Hopper (lui-même) (saison 4, épisode 3)
 2007 : Veronica Mars : le père de Madison (?) (saison 3, épisode 12)
 2008 : Power Rangers : Jungle Fury : maître Mao (Nathaniel Lees)
 2009 : Nip/Tuck : Manny Caldarello (Richard Portnow) (saison 5, épisode 21)
 2009 : Californication : Peter Fonda (lui-même) (saison 3, épisode 9)
 2009 : NCIS : Los Angeles : Rick Pargo (Gregory Scott Cummins) (saison 1, épisode 6)
 2009-2014 : Les Enquêtes de Murdoch : juge Mitchell Wilson (Tom McCamus) (saison 2, épisode 5) et le prête (Neil Foster) (saison 7, épisode 12)
 2010 : Lie to Me : Leo O'Sullivan (Bruce Weitz) (saison 2, épisode 13)
 2010 : Chuck : le serveur du train (Ian Patrick Williams) (saison 3, épisode 14)
 2010 : Party Down : Howard Greengold (Alex Rocco) (saison 2, épisode 10)
 2010 : Borgen, une femme au pouvoir : Parly Petersen (Claus Bue) (saison 1, épisode 3) et Holger Brodersen (Niels Weyde) (saison 2, épisode 6)
 2011 : The Defenders : Carmine (Daniel J. Travanti) (saison 1, épisode 13)
 2011 : Les Experts : Oscar B. Goodman (lui-même) (saison 12, épisode 4)
 2011-2012 : Luck : Nick DeRossi (Alan Rosenberg)
 2011-2012 : The Good Wife : Frank Michael Thomas (Fred Dalton Thompson)
 2012 : True Blood : général Cavanaugh (Phil Reeves) (saison 5, épisode 11)
 2013 : The Killing : Raymond Seward Sr. (Duncan Fraser) (saison 3, épisode 6)
 2013-2014 : Castle : Jackson Hunt (James Brolin)
 2014 : Marvel : Les Agents du SHIELD : le vieil homme dans le train (Stan Lee) (saison 1, épisode 13)
 2014 : Mammon, la révélation : professeur Stellesnæs (Harald Brenna)
 2014 : Madam Secretary : l'ambassadeur Lester Clark (Robert Klein) (saison 1, épisode 6)
 2014-2017 : The Leftovers : Kevin Garvey Sr. (Scott Glenn)
 2015 : Under the Dome : colonel Walker (Dann Florek) (saison 3, épisode 13)
 2016 : Frankenstein Code : Jimmy Pritchard âgé (Philip Baker Hall)
 2016-2018 : Better Call Saul : Clifford Main (Ed Begley Jr.) (1er voix, saisons 2 et 4)
 2016 : Westworld : le vieux Bill (Michael Wincott)
 2016 : Madoff, l'arnaque du siècle : Carl Shapiro (Charles Grodin) (mini-série)
 2017-2018 : Grace et Frankie : Nick Skolka (Peter Gallagher) (1er voix, saisons 3 à 5)
 2017 : Colony : Hennessey (William Russ)
 2017-2018 : Au fil des jours : Berto (Tony Plana) (1er voix, saisons 1 et 2)
 2018 : Meurtres au paradis : Frank O'Toole (James Faulkner) (saison 7, épisode 3)

Animated Shows 

 Le Roi Arthur et les chevaliers de justice : Lord Viper / Seigneur Vipère
 Reboot : virus Megabyte / capitaine Capacitor / Phong / Slash (saison 3)
 Action Man : le docteur X
 Les Razmoket : Jean-Roger, Charles
 Razbitume ! : Jean-Roger, Charles
 Iznogoud : voix additionnelles
 Bêtes à craquer : l'éléphant Eugène
 Le Tour du monde en quatre-vingts jours : Philéas Fogg
 Tic et Tac, les rangers du risque : Catox
 She-Ra, la princesse du pouvoir : Flèche d'or (1re voix)
 Les Animaux du Bois de Quat'sous : Renard
 Les Chevaliers du Zodiaque : Shiryu, Hyoga, Docrates et Phaéton
 Samouraï Pizza Cats : le narrateur
 Double Dragon : le Maître de l'ombre
 1992-1997 : X-Men : Magneto, le Fauve
 1997-2000 : Timothy et ses peluches : Zébron, Ti'Nours et le narrateur
 1999-2013 : Futurama : Bender Tordeur Rodríguez (sauf saisons 4 et 5), Docteur Zoidberg (saisons 1 à 3 et films), Flexo, Léo Wong (saisons 1 à 3)
 2010 / 2012 : Archer : Lord Feltchley (saison 1, épisode 2) et Burt Reynolds (saison 3, épisode 4)
 2011 : Wakfu : le procureur (saison 2)

Videogames 

 2002 : Blade 2 : Abraham Whistler
 2002 : Kingdom Hearts : Dr Finkelstein
 2003 : Futurama : Bender Rodriguez
 2004 : Rome: Total War : le capitaine carthaginois
 2004 : Halo 2 : Sesa 'Refumee
 2005 : Kameo: Elements of Power : l'entraineur
 2005 : Kingdom Hearts 2 : le Dr Finkelstein
 2006 : Le Parrain : Santino « Sonny » Corleone
 2006 : Secret Files : Tunguska : le père de Nina
 2006 : The Secrets of Da Vinci : Le Manuscrit interdit : François 1er
 2008 : Fallout 3 : le président Eden
 2009 : Dragon Age: Origins : Riordan
 2011 : Star Wars: The Old Republic : voix additionnelles
 2013 : Disney Infinity : le shérif de Colby
 2014 : Destiny : Arach Jalaal, l'émissaire de l'Astre Mort
 2014 : Halo 2 : Anniversary : Elite de l'introduction, Sesa 'Refumee
 2015 : The Order: 1886 : le Grand Chancelier
 2015 : Heroes of the Storm : Ka, annonceur de la carte Temple Céleste
 2017 : Destiny 2 : Arach Jalaal, l'émissaire de l'Astre Mort
 2016 : Total War: Warhammer : le narrateur
 2017 : World of Warcraft: Legion : Silgryn
 2018 : Detroit: Become Human : Carl Manfred

Documentaries 

 Jackie Chan : My Stunts (1999) : le narrateur

Advertisements 

 Teenage Mutant Hero Turtles (1990) : voix off
 Brut (Fabergé) (1998) : voix off
 Star Trek : les dossiers officiels (1999) : voix off
 Télé Z (2004) : voix off
 Viandes et pommes du Limousin (2004) : voix off défendant les pommes
 Aviva (2007) : voix off
 Lindt (2008) : le maître chocolatier
 MAIF (2010) : voix du grand-père
 World of Warcraft (2011) : Chuck Norris
 Fiat Pro "C'est du costaud" (2017) : Chuck Norris

As Artistic Director 

 Téléfilms

 Mauvaise Influence

 Séries télévisées

 Sept à la maison
 Awake
 Dharma et Greg
 Un cas pour deux
 Do Over
 DOS : Division des opérations spéciales
 Un drôle de shérif
 Frasier
 Haute Tension
 Moi et ma belle-famille
 New York Police Blues
 Romeo
 Sunset Beach
 Supernatural
 The Closer : L.A. enquêtes prioritaires
 The Palace

 Séries animées

 Samouraï Pizza Cats
 Bêtes à craquer
 Futurama (saisons 1 à 3)

References

External links

1938 births
2021 deaths
French male voice actors
Male actors from Paris
French male film actors
20th-century French male actors
Deaths from dementia in France
Deaths from Alzheimer's disease